Mayfield Mountain, Granville County, North Carolina is situated in Wilton, North Carolina. This hill is accompanied by one other "mountain" called Jenkins Mountain. These hills rise two to three hundred feet above the surrounding hills. At the base of these mountains is a river called Ford's Fork creek.  These hills are abundant with wildlife including Whitetail deer, Bobcats, Coyotes, Carolina river dogs, Groundhogs, Turkeys, Red and yellow tailed hawks, Owls, Grey squirrels, Black bears, and Rabbits. These mountains are privately owned.

Mountains of North Carolina
Landforms of Granville County, North Carolina